The Young Offenders is a coming-of-age sitcom, developed by Peter Foott. Adapted from the 2016 film of the same title, the programme began broadcasting through RTÉ2 in Ireland and BBC Three in the United Kingdom (all episodes are available for streaming via BBC iPlayer). The series follows the troubled lives of "lovable rogues" Conor MacSweeney (Alex Murphy) and Jock O'Keefe (Chris Walley).

The first series was broadcast between 1 February and 8 March 2018, consisting of 6 episodes. A Christmas special followed, which was released on 14 December of the same year. The success of the first series led to a second being commissioned, which aired for another 6 episodes, all episodes being available for streaming on 3 November 2019, though broadcast in Ireland weekly, until 8 December.

Series overview

Episodes

Series 1 (2018)

The first series was first released in the Ireland and the United Kingdom on 1 February 2018. It was broadcast on a weekly basis in both countries, concluding on 8 March 2018. A Christmas special was then broadcast, first released in the United Kingdom on 14 December 2018, though broadcast in Ireland on Christmas Day.

Series 2 (2019)
The Young Offenders was recommissioned for a second series in February 2018. It was broadcast in Ireland between 11 November and 16 December 2019, though was released in the United Kingdom automatically through BBC iPlayer on 3 November.

Series 3 (2020)
In November 2019, it was confirmed that The Young Offenders had been recommissioned for a third series, to be broadcast in 2020, shortly after the second series concluded. Prior to its Television premiere, the third series debuted on BBC iPlayer on 19 July.

References

Lists of British sitcom episodes
Lists of British teen comedy television series episodes